Lisa Whybourn (born 11 May 1991) is an English retired tennis player.

She broke into the world top 250 in June 2010 following her run to the final qualifying round at Wimbledon. Whybourn is originally from Hemingford Grey in Huntingdon, Cambridgeshire, but is now coaching at the Hume Tennis And Community Centre in Craigieburn, Victoria.

Tennis career

Junior years
Lisa played her first junior ITF tournament in April 2006 and her last in the qualifying rounds for the Wimbledon Championships in June 2009. Over these three years she reached three singles finals (winning two of them) as well as three semifinals. She never passed the first round of junior Wimbledon and did not compete in any of the other three Grand Slam junior events. In doubles, she managed to win two titles. She was also a doubles runner-up twice and a semifinalist twice. Whybourn amassed a singles win–loss record of 31–22 and a win–loss record of 24–20 in doubles. Her career-high combined singles and doubles ranking was world No. 177 which was achieved on 19 May 2008.

ITF Circuit & WTA Tour
Lisa first competed on the ITF Circuit in 2006 when she played two $10k events in Britain and lost in the qualifying rounds for each one. 2007 saw her compete in three more events worth $10k and again she lost in the qualifying stages. In 2008, she again competed in a number of lower-level ITF events and did not pass the first round in any of them.

Her first ITF semifinal came in September 2009 at the $10k event in Cumberland in London where she was beaten by Jade Windley, a fellow Brit. Immediately following this, she reached the second round of a $75k tournament in Shrewsbury before being beaten in straight sets by Elena Baltacha. After this, she reached the quarterfinals of a $50k event. Her very first year-end world ranking was No. 531.

In April 2010, Whybourn reached the semifinals of a $10k event before going on to reach her first ever ITF final later that month where she was beaten by a Slovakian, Romana Tabakova. Another $10k quarterfinal followed before Whybourn received a wildcard into the qualifying draw for the Birmingham Classic where she was beaten by Sophie Ferguson. She was then the recipient of another wildcard, this one allowing her entry into Wimbledon qualifying. She beat Sally Peers and Anna Floris, before being stopped in the final round by Andrea Hlaváčková. Returning to the ITF Circuit for the rest of the season, Lisa reached two more quarterfinals and one more semifinal. Her year-end ranking was No. 333. Her career-high WTA ranking was 250. 

In July 2017, Whybourn announced her retirement from tennis due to an accumulation of injuries and surgeries.

ITF finals

Singles (0–4)

Doubles (7–4)

References

External links
 
 

1991 births
Living people
British female tennis players
English female tennis players
People from Huntingdon
Sportspeople from Bath, Somerset
Tennis people from Cambridgeshire
English tennis coaches
English expatriate sportspeople in Australia